Quan Xin (born November 24, 1996) is a Chinese slalom canoeist who has competed at the international level since 2015.

He won a gold medal in the K1 event at the 2018 Asian Games and a silver in the same event at the 2016 Asian Championships.

Quan participated at the delayed 2020 Summer Olympics in Tokyo, where he finished 17th in the K1 event after being eliminated in the semifinal.

References

External links

Chinese male canoeists
1996 births
Living people
People from Nanping
Sportspeople from Fujian
Canoeists at the 2020 Summer Olympics
Olympic canoeists of China
Asian Games medalists in canoeing
Canoeists at the 2018 Asian Games
Asian Games gold medalists for China
Medalists at the 2018 Asian Games